Davenport Creek is a stream in Cache County, Utah, United States.
It then turns northwest and runs in that direction for most of its course before emptying into the South Fork Little Bear River at a point immediately west of Utah State Route 162. (The Little Bear River in turn, flows roughly north-northeast, through the Hyrum Reservoir, until it reaches the Bear River in the Cutler Reservoir. The Bear River then flows south to the Great Salt Lake.) The main tributaries of Davenport Creek are Pole Creek, Bald Head Creek, Smith Creek, and Fish Creek.

Davenport Creek was named for James Davenport, a lumberman.

See also

List of rivers of Utah

References

Rivers of Cache County, Utah
Rivers of Utah